Colin McCarthy (born May 30, 1988) is a former professional American football linebacker. He played college football at the University of Miami after graduating from Clearwater Central Catholic High School. He was considered one of the better linebacker prospects for the 2011 NFL Draft.

Professional career
McCarthy was selected in the 4th round with the 109th pick by the Tennessee Titans in the 2011 NFL Draft.

Tennessee Titans
McCarthy recorded the first interception of his career when he picked off a pass from Josh Freeman on November 27, 2011. McCarthy was voted the AFC Defensive Player of the Week and Pepsi NFL Rookie of the Week for his performance against the Buffalo Bills on December 4, 2011. McCarthy recorded 9 tackles, 1 forced fumble, and 2 fumble recoveries.

McCarthy missed the entire 2014 season with a dislocated shoulder.

Retirement
On June 4, 2015, McCarthy announced his retirement from the NFL, at the age of 27.

References

External links
Miami Hurricanes bio

1988 births
Living people
American football linebackers
Miami Hurricanes football players
People from Birdsboro, Pennsylvania
Sportspeople from the Delaware Valley
Tennessee Titans players